The 1939 Clackmannanshire and East Stirlingshire by-election was held on 13 October 1939.  The by-election was held due to the death of the incumbent Labour MP, Lauchlin MacNeill Weir.  It was won by the Labour candidate Arthur Woodburn.

References

Clackmannanshire and East Stirlingshire by-election
1930s elections in Scotland
Politics of Clackmannanshire
Stirlingshire
Politics of Stirling (council area)
Clackmannanshire and East Stirlingshire by-election
By-elections to the Parliament of the United Kingdom in Scottish constituencies
20th century in Clackmannanshire